Funding Together is a South Korean reality show program on MBC. It airs on MBC starting from August 18, 2019 on Sundays at 18:30 (KST).

Synopsis 
In this show, the 4 casts, You Hee-yeol, Yoo Jun-sang, Noh Hong-chul, Yoo In-na and Jang Do-yeon will be showcasing their ideas that might be difficult to put into reality alone and through the help of the viewers, they will help to fund the project.

List of episodes

Ratings 
 Ratings listed below are the individual corner ratings of Funding Together. (Note: Individual corner ratings do not include commercial time, which regular ratings include.)

Awards and nominations

References

External links 
 Official website 

MBC TV original programming
South Korean television shows
2019 South Korean television series debuts
Korean-language television shows
South Korean variety television shows
South Korean reality television series